KartKraft is a karting racing simulator game that emphasizes realistic physics. It was originally created by Australian independent developer Black Delta which in 2021 was acquired by Motorsport Games. After being in Early Access on the Steam store since November 2018, the game was officially released on January 26, 2022.

Development history
Work on the KartKraft project began in 2015 when Zach Griffin created the Black Delta studio. In March 2021 KartKraft developer Black Delta was acquired by Motorsport Games.

Features and content
At time of the 1.0 release KartKraft features 7 officially licensed, laser-scanned circuits, plus the fictional Hangar Track: Whilton Mill circuit, Karting Genk, Atlanta Motorsports Park, The Geelong Kart Club, Go Kart Club of Victoria (GKCV, also in reverse configuration), PF International (PFI, also in the Classis layout), and the Brentomonte Circuit. 
Vehicles include the entry-level KA100, the intermediate X30, the advanced KZ2 gearbox kart, the Praga 600cc ‘Monster’ Kart, and the KartKross.

Online multiplayer support includes a bespoke hopper matchmaking system, but it is initially limited to practice sessions and only with the KA100 class of karts, and up to 25 players. KartKraft uses the Unreal Engine and supports virtual reality, triple screen play, and full motion platforms.

Reception

Hardcore Gamer praised the accuracy of the simulation elements, but panned the title as a game.

References

External links
 

Kart racing video games
2022 video games
Video games developed in Australia
Windows games
Windows-only games
Multiplayer and single-player video games
Racing video games
Unreal Engine games